Ontojärvi–Nurmesjärvi is a rather large lake in the Oulujoki main catchment area in Kainuu, Finland. It is situated in the municipality of Kuhmo. It is the 44th largest lake in the country.

References

Oulujoki basin
Lakes of Kuhmo